Events from the year 1235 in Ireland.

Incumbent
Lord: Henry III

Events

Final conquest of Connacht by Richard Mor de Burgh. Felim mac Cathal Crobderg Ua Conchobair is expelled, but allowed to rent five “King’s Cantreds”.

Births

Deaths
Madudan Óg Ó Madadhan, King of Síol Anmchadha.

References

 
1230s in Ireland
Ireland
Years of the 13th century in Ireland